Henry Dolphus Smith (December 23, 1819 – November 22, 1889) was an Ontario political figure. He represented Leeds North and Grenville North in the Legislative Assembly of Ontario as a Liberal member from 1867 to 1871.

He was born in Wolford Township, Grenville County, Upper Canada in 1819, the son of Methodist minister William Smith. He married Josephine Bass. Smith operated an iron foundry. He served as reeve for Wolford and for Merrickville. Before he was elected to the Ontario legislature, Smith ran unsuccessfully three times for the same seat in the legislative assembly of the Province of Canada. He defeated Ogle Gowan in the 1867 general election; he was defeated by Henry Merrick in the general election that followed in 1871.

He died in Nebraska in 1889.

External links 
The Canadian parliamentary companion HJ Morgan (1869)
Member's parliamentary history for the Legislative Assembly of Ontario

1819 births
Ontario Liberal Party MPPs
1889 deaths